The Department of Prices and Consumer Protection was a short-lived United Kingdom government department created by the incoming Labour government in 1974 when the functions of the Department of Trade and Industry were divided between three new departments (the Department of Trade, the Department of Industry and the Department of Prices and Consumer Protection). In 1979 the department was abolished by the new Conservative government and its responsibilities were re-integrated into the Department of Trade.

Secretaries of State for Prices and Consumer Protection
Colour key (for political parties):

Prices and Consumer Protection
Ministries established in 1974
1974 establishments in the United Kingdom
1979 disestablishments in the United Kingdom
Consumer protection in the United Kingdom